Ahmed Tahir Baduri was the Ambassador and Permanent Representative to the United Nations for Eritrea between 2001 and 2005, replacing Haile Menkerios. Baduri was replaced by Araya Desta. 

Baduri was born in Hargigo in 1946. After finishing elementary education in Hargigo, he travelled to Egypt where he completed secondary education. He joined Halab University in Syria and studied medicine, but quit his studies in 1969 and joined the Eritrean Liberation Front. He then joined the People's Liberation Forces, PLF, which split from the ELF in 1970 and was a founding member of the Eritrean People's Liberation Front. He was a member of the central committee of the Eritrean People's Liberation Front. After the liberation of Eritrea, he served in the government in different capacities and was the head of the investment office and the chamber of commerce.

External links

1946 births
Living people
Permanent Representatives of Eritrea to the United Nations